Jackson Barton (born August 8, 1995) is an American football offensive tackle who is a free agent. He played college football at Utah and was drafted by the Indianapolis Colts in the seventh round of the 2019 NFL Draft. He has also been a member of the Kansas City Chiefs and New York Giants.

Professional career

Indianapolis Colts
Barton was drafted by the Indianapolis Colts in the seventh round (240th overall) of the 2019 NFL Draft. He was waived on August 31, 2019, and was signed to the practice squad the next day.

Kansas City Chiefs
Barton was signed by the Kansas City Chiefs off the Colts practice squad on November 11, 2019. Barton was part of the Chiefs team which won Super Bowl LIV after defeating the San Francisco 49ers 31–20. He was waived on September 5, 2020.

New York Giants
On September 6, 2020, Barton was claimed off waivers by the New York Giants. He signed a contract extension with the Giants on January 4, 2021.

On August 31, 2021, Barton was waived by the Giants and re-signed to the practice squad the next day.

Las Vegas Raiders
On September 21, 2021, Barton was signed off the Giants' practice squad by the Las Vegas Raiders. He appeared in two games for the team, playing three snaps versus Washington in week 13, and three snaps against Kansas City in week 14.

On October 1, 2022, Barton was waived by the Raiders and re-signed to the practice squad. On October 26, 2022, Barton was signed to the active roster.

Personal life
Barton's younger brother, Cody, was drafted by the Seattle Seahawks in the third round of the 2019 NFL Draft. His sister, Dani, is a member of the United States women's national volleyball team.

References

External links
Utah Utes bio

1995 births
Living people
Players of American football from Salt Lake City
American football offensive tackles
Utah Utes football players
Indianapolis Colts players
Kansas City Chiefs players
New York Giants players
Las Vegas Raiders players